Craig Haggard is an American politician. He serves as a Republican member for the 57th district of the Indiana House of Representatives.

Life and career 
Haggard was raised in Mooresville, Indiana. He attended Mooresville High School, graduating in 1987.

Haggard served in the United States Marine Corps for twelve years, and was formerly in the Indiana National Guard.

In May 2022, Haggard defeated Melinda Griesemer in the Republican primary election for the 57th district of the Indiana House of Representatives. No candidate was nominated to challenge him in the general election. He succeeded Sean Eberhart.

References 

Living people
Year of birth missing (living people)
Place of birth missing (living people)
Republican Party members of the Indiana House of Representatives
21st-century American politicians